The Kyrgyzstan Fed Cup team represents Kyrgyzstan in Fed Cup tennis competition and are governed by the Kyrgyzstan Tennis Federation.  

Kyrgyzstan competed in Asia/Oceania Zone Group II in 2011.

History
Kyrgyzstan competed in its first Fed Cup in 2003. Their best result was finishing runner-up in Asia/Oceania Zone Group II in 2010, beating Philippines, Syria and Hong Kong, before losing to India in the promotion play-off.  Prior to 1993, Kyrgyzstan players represented the Soviet Union.

See also
Fed Cup
Kyrgyzstan Davis Cup team

External links

Billie Jean King Cup teams
Fed Cup
Fed Cup